Sahara Hare is a 1955 Warner Bros. Looney Tunes theatrical cartoon short directed by Friz Freleng. The short was released on March 26, 1955, and stars Bugs Bunny and Yosemite Sam.

Plot
This is another classic battle between Bugs Bunny and Yosemite Sam (referred to here as “Riff Raff Sam”). Bugs pops up after tunneling underground, thinking he has reached Miami Beach, when in reality he is in the Sahara Desert, presumably because of “not making that left turn at Albuquerque”. He comes prepared with a beach chair, sunscreen, sunglasses and even a bucket of carrots and ice. Bugs runs across the desert for some time, before eventually becoming dehydrated. He thinks he has found a nice park when he stumbles upon a water hole and a palm tree, only to get himself covered in mud (much of this scene reuses animation from Frigid Hare).

Meanwhile, Sam, riding on a camel, suddenly comes upon Bugs’ tracks and exclaims: “Great horny toads! A trespasser, gettin’ footy-prints all over my desert!” Sam orders the camel to go after the footprints, and then orders it to slow down (“Whoa, camel, whoa!! Whoa!! Whoa, camel! WHOA!!!! Aw, come on, whoa! When I say ‘whoa!’ I mean ‘WHOA!’”), before whacking it on the head with his rifle and knocking it out. As Sam scolds the camel for not slowing down (“Now I hope that’ll learn ya, ya hump-backed muley!”), Bugs grabs Sam’s keffiyeh like a restroom paper towel dispenser (which comes back as such as part of the gag) and uses it to rub soap out of his eyes. Bugs then asks Sam his catchphrase: “Eeehhh... What’s up doc? You with the sideshow around here?” Sam angrily retorts: “I’m no doc, ya flea-bitten varmint! I’m Riff-Raff Sam, the riffiest riff that ever riffed a raff!”, to which Bugs replies, “Yer slip is showin’”.

Bugs flees and Sam orders his camel to follow Bugs, but it does not run until Sam yells: “When I say ‘giddy-up’, I mean ‘GIDDY-UP!’”, and whacks it in the posterior. Sam runs after the camel and orders it to slow down, repeating his “Whoa” phrase before hitting it in the head with the rifle once again (“When I say ‘whoa’, I mean WHOA!”). During this, Bugs spots a vintage car and tries to switch it on, but it turns out to be a mirage. Bugs flees into a deserted French army base and shuts the door, causing Sam to be knocked into it.

Sam orders Bugs to surrender and open the door; but this time, the door opens like a drawbridge and crushes Sam − when Sam screams for Bugs to close it, it raises to reveal Sam flattened and running around enraged (the same gag would be later reused for Knighty Knight Bugs). Sam then tries various methods to getting into the fort, but they all fail:

Sam tries to pole-vault into the fort, but he ends up hitting a battlement that shatters out its opposite side, leaving an imprint in the shape of Sam’s body.
Sam tries to saw out a brick in the gate to get entrance into the fort, but Bugs puts a cannon in the hole, much to Sam’s shock. Bugs fires, launching Sam across the desert. He smashes through a tree and leaves a scar on some sandy hills from where Sam was shoved through.
Sam uses stilts to reach the fort with a gun and says to Bugs: “Okay, rabbit! I got a bead on ya!” But as he fires the gun, the recoil causes the stilts to fall backwards with him to the ground, and he stomps on them.
Sam uses an elephant to try and force his way into the fort, but Bugs winds up a toy mouse and lets it through the door. When the elephant sees the mouse, it gets scared and uses Sam to swat it before it flees, leaving an injured and dazed Sam behind.
Sam tries to sling-shot himself into the fort, but first he hits a tree and slides off it. Sam then chops down the tree with a fire-ax and tries again, but he hits another tree next to the dead tree before sliding off again.
Sam puts a long board of wood on the fort gate’s side and tries to climb it. Bugs, waiting at the top, uses a fire-ax to chop the wood in two bits − soon, when the wood falls in two bits, Sam is revealed to have magically been chopped in two as well.

Eventually, Bugs sets up a trap where in a secret entrance to the fort, Sam must open several doors to get into the fort. What Sam does not notice is that the final door is set with bombs. As Sam continues to open all doors Bugs walks off (“I wonder if he’s stubborn enough to open all those doors”). An explosion occurs off screen (“Yup. He’s stubborn enough”).

A hole then opens up on the ground. Similar to Bugs’ arrival, a beach chair, an umbrella and a bucket of ice come flying out of the hole. Daffy Duck then jumps out of the hole. Like Bugs in the beginning, Daffy thinks he has arrived at Miami Beach and enthusiastically runs toward the non-existent ocean. Bugs tries to tell Daffy that he is not at Miami Beach, but Daffy doesn’t see him. As the cartoon finishes,  Bugs says to the audience: “Eh, let him find out for himself!”.

See also
List of American films of 1955
 List of Bugs Bunny cartoons
 List of Yosemite Sam cartoons
 Rif, a mainly mountainous region of northern Morocco

Notes
Scenes were reused in the 1959 Merrie Melodies cartoon Hare-Abian Nights, the 1963 Merrie Melodies cartoon Devil's Feud Cake, and "Act 1" of the 1981 film The Looney Looney Looney Bugs Bunny Movie.

This cartoon was also the first cartoon to use Milt Franklyn's version of "The Merry-Go-Round Broke Down", which would stay in use until 1964.

Home media
VHS - Yosemite Sam: The Good, The Bad and The Ornery
Laserdisc - Longitude and Looneytude: Globe-trotting Looney Tunes Favorites
DVD - Looney Tunes Golden Collection: Volume 4

References

External links

 

1955 films
1955 animated films
1955 short films
1950s American animated films
1950s Warner Bros. animated short films
Looney Tunes shorts
Films set in Egypt
Films set in deserts
Short films directed by Friz Freleng
Daffy Duck films
Films scored by Milt Franklyn
Bugs Bunny films
Yosemite Sam films
1950s English-language films
Films set in the Sahara